This is a list of museums in Svalbard, a Norwegian archipelago in the Arctic Ocean. 

Barentsburg Pomor Museum, located in Barentsburg
Ny-Ålesund Town and Mine Museum, located in Ny-Ålesund
Pyramiden Museum, located in Pyramiden
Spitsbergen Airship Museum, located in Longyearbyen
Svalbard Museum, located in Longyearbyen

See also

 List of museums
 Tourism in Svalbard
 Culture of Svalbard

References

Museums in Svalbard
 
Svalbard
Museums